Kro (sometimes referred to as the Warlord Kro) is a fictional supervillain appearing in American comic books published by Marvel Comics.

Kro appeared in the Marvel Cinematic Universe film Eternals (2021), voiced by Bill Skarsgård.

Publication history
Created by Jack Kirby, Kro first appeared in The Eternals #1 (July 1976).

Fictional character biography
In the Marvel Universe, Kro is a military leader and sometimes acts as the leader of the Deviant race, an evolutionary offshoot of the human race created by the Celestials. He is one of the first Earth Deviants created. Besides being a shapeshifter, he is immortal. He hides this from his fellow Deviants by pretending to be a long line of fathers/sons. Also hidden from the Deviants is his long-standing (100,000 years) on-off relationship with Thena, leader of the Eternals and mother of their twin children, Donald & Deborah Ritter. This relationship unravels during the course of the story.

In the past, Kro has disguised himself as the Devil in order to try to influence or frighten humans. His control over his own molecules renders him immune to the genetic manipulations of Ghaur.

In the advent of the Heroic age, Kro attacked New York, trying to incite fear in the human population of the incoming Celestial judgement. He battled the Eternals and agreed a truce with his old lover Thena, showing themselves to the modern world. He tried to reconcile with Thena, bringing her to the City of Toads of Lemuria. She was treated as royalty, but she became horrified with many of the Deviants practices, like the purge of the very monstrous deviants, and the Gladiator's fights to the death. She took the Deviant gladiators Ramsak and Karkas, and fled Lemuria, leaving Kro angry. He battled the Asgardian God Thor, when he went to the Deviant city under New York, to rescue some of the Eternals. Kro was left behind by Brother Tode, who escaped in a flying pod. Kro also took part in the ill-advised assault in Olympia. The Deviant's aristocracy, led by Brother Tode, kidnapped the Eternals and intended to disintegrate them. Kro tried to save Thena, but she rejected him again. The hero Iron Man (James Rhodes) rescued the Eternals and helped them defeat the deviant invasion. Then the Eternals transformed the deviant's aristocracy into a synthetic cube, killing them. Thena saved Kro, and he was the only survivor of the failed attack.

After the death of Brother Tode, Kro returned to Lemuria and became a figurehead monarch for the Deviants. He had a power struggle with Priestlord Ghaur, who now decided to take the power de facto. Kro attacked the Eternals once more with his giant armada. However, Ikaris and Makkari defeated the Deviants. Kro was betrayed by some agents of Ghaur and escaped. He joined Thena and both were running away from the Deviants and the Eternals. Finally, Ikaris found them and replaced Thena as Prime Eternal after a ceremony. Ghaur tried to take the power of the Dreaming Celestial, and was stopped by the Avengers and Eternals. After the disintegration of Ghaur, Kro remained as the unique leader of the Deviants. He had another dispute with Thena, when he revealed that he was influencing her with a new type of brain mine. Kro also agreed to a truce with Ikaris. He was acting as monarch when Quasar came to Lemuria, and he was organizing gladiator matches. Some time later, Kro became depressed by the loss of Thena, and abdicated the throne to search for her again. He located her and their twin children, Donald & Deborah Ritter, conceived long before his attack in New York. Together, they ended the tyranny of Brother Visara in Lemuria, and joined as a family. Kro was also the founder of the Deviant team Delta Network, including some heroic Deviants like Ramsak, Karkas and his own children. He led them in an attempt to rescue the Avengers from a resurrected Ghaur. Kro and Thena searched for their children when they were captured by the villain Maelstrom. When the mad priest Ghaur tried to form an Anti-Mind, in his plan to battle the Celestials, and captured the Ritters and Thena, Kro led his deviant faction to rescue his children and his lover. However, he was outmatched by Ghaur's power, and kept up the fight against Ghaur as his family escaped.

Kro and Ghaur formed bickering factions and kept the struggle for power in Deviant Lemuria. The external world did not know who was in charge. Kro was still recognized as the formal monarch in the UN and opposed the attack of the Black Panther and Wakanda against his nation. When the Avengers defeated some Deviants tribesman, they transferred them to Kro's control, as he was the Deviant King at the time.

Much later, a plague devastated Lemuria, the Deviants males were rendered sterile and a power struggle between Ereshkigal and Ghaur happened. Ghaur won when he promised the deviants the return of the fertility with the help of the kidnapped eternal Phastos. Kro was acting in the sidelines as general and he was who attacked the unprotected Olympia, bringing the Eternal resurrecting machine and Phastos to Lemuria. Thor rescued Phastos and battled Ghaur. Kro kept the intrigue against Ghaur, and approached Ereshkigal. He activated the Asgardian Unbiding stone that she had stolen, but it got out of control, threatening all reality. When Thor destroyed the stone, Ghaur and Ereshkigal disappeared and Kro was left leading the Deviants. He regretted the incident and said to Thor that he had abandoned his ambitions.

Powers and abilities
Despite his Deviant heritage, Kro possesses a number of superhuman traits that are characteristic of an Eternal. Kro maintains a virtually unbreakable mental control over the processes and structure of his body, even when he is asleep or unconscious. As a result, Kro has a lifespan that has already lasted over 100,000 years and is immune to disease and aging. His mental control over his body enables him to maintain a youthful, vigorous physical condition. However, Kro is not so nearly indestructible as the Eternals. (For example, Ikaris nearly killed Kro once by strangulation.) But while sufficient force can kill Kro, he can use his mental control over his body to heal himself after being injured.

Kro also possesses the power of physical malleability, which is atypical for a Deviant. At will, he can cause most of the tissue of his body to become pliant, enabling him to shape it mentally like putty into different configurations. Once the tissue is set in an altered form, Kro has only to stop concentrating and his body will retain that shape until such time as he concentrates upon changing it again. This ability enables him to disguise himself and take the appearance of others (with cosmetic help for skin color, body hair, and so forth). One of Kro's favorite ploys is to pass himself off among ordinary humanity as a demon by fashioning horns on his head.

Kro's shape-changing powers are limited. He cannot alter the shape of his skeleton in more than minor ways. Moreover, he cannot eliminate any of his mass while transforming; he can only redistribute his  of weight. Hence, he usually only uses his shape-changing power to alter his facial features. He can mentally mold the shape of his skull somewhat.

Kro has about three times the physical endurance of an ordinary human athlete. His heart is not located in the same place as an ordinary human being's; its true location is unrevealed.

In other media

Film
 Kro serves as the secondary antagonist in the Marvel Cinematic Universe film Eternals (2021), voiced by Bill Skarsgård. He is a Deviant general and an enemy of the Eternals. By assassinating Ajak and absorbing her powers, Kro and the Deviants begin to evolve. After demonstrating his healing abilities, he steals the power of Gilgamesh and kills him while gaining a humanoid form. Now able to vocalize, he says that the Deviants were only fighting for the survival of their species, and that he will not forgive the Eternals for what they’ve done. While the Eternals battle Ikaris, Kro tries to steal Thena's power by luring her with the voice of Gilgamesh, but is killed by her, avenging the fallen Eternals.

References

Further reading
 The Eternal #4 - #6 (2004)

External links
"K" in the Encyclopaedia Olympianna
Marvel Directory entry on Kro
The Unofficial Handbook of Marvel Comics' Creators
 

Comics characters introduced in 1976
Characters created by Jack Kirby
Marvel Comics characters with superhuman strength
Marvel Comics Deviants
Marvel Comics supervillains
Marvel Comics characters who are shapeshifters
Fictional characters with immortality
Marvel Comics characters with accelerated healing